John Collard Field was an Ontario political figure. He represented Northumberland West in the Legislative Assembly of Ontario from 1879 to 1883 as a Liberal member.

He was born in Wiveliscombe, Somerset, England, the son of John Field, and came to Cobourg, Upper Canada with his parents in 1834. In 1844, he married Thirsa Pearse. He served as a member of the town council for Cobourg. Field operated a general store in Cobourg with his younger brother, Corelli Collard, who also represented Northumberland West in the provincial assembly and later became mayor of Cobourg.

His sister Myra Jane married William Kerr, who represented Northumberland West in the federal parliament. He died in 1903.

References

External links 
The Canadian parliamentary companion, 1883 JA Gemmill

The Canadian biographical dictionary and portrait gallery of eminent and self-made men ... (1880) : Entry for John Field

Ontario Liberal Party MPPs
People from Wiveliscombe
People from Cobourg
1822 births
1903 deaths